= Umatu Festival =

Annual Nigerian Festival

Umatu festival
- Status: Active
- Genre: Festivals
- Frequency: Annually
- Location: Onitsha
- Country: Nigeria

Umatu festival is an annual 16-day harvest festival held in Onitsha, Anambra State, Nigeria. It is one of six major annual festivities held in Onitsha, the others being Ajachi, Owuwaji, Ofala, Osisi- Ite and Ife-Jioku. The Umatu is celebrated when the first maize has been cultivated. The people meet with the King (Obi) and his red hat leaders (Ndiche) to celebrate the prosperity of the maize crop.

== History ==
The Umatu Festival is inspired by Exodus 23:16: “Celebrate the Harvest Festival when you begin to harvest your crops. Celebrate the Festival of Shelter in the autumn, when you gather the fruit from your vineyard and orchard’’. With its Biblical derivations, the King and the chiefs of his Red Cap will dance to the egwu ota in order to celebrate the festival surrounding the Ime-Obi (King's Palace). This dance is usually hierarchical, from the bottom to the top. Onowu Iyasele (Traditional Prime Minister) is the highest ranking chief who dances himself before the Obi of Onitsha.

== Festivity ==
The main aspect of the Umatu is the nni oka (corn meal), which is served with the ofe onino (drawing soup) and its cabinet following the Iba. The nni oka is normally served in a native bowl called an ugbugba. Other refreshments served at Ime Obi during the Umatu are ukwa, okpodudu, and aku.

When Obi receives the nni oka, he cuts and shares with everyone present, beginning with his Red Cap leaders. Goats and fowls are also slain in order to make either dee onino or okwulu soup (draw soup). The people and the community in the entire area then pray for good health and prosperity.

The Umatu is of great significance to the farming community of Onicha at that time, as reflected in an old saying, ugbo eketalu okwulu olilijie elugonso, meaning the farmland which you could pick okro, signifies that yam harvests are approaching (New yam festival).

The Umatu festival lasts 16 days, starting with the Obi of Onitsha private celebration. Then, for four days Eze-Idi, Ikpala Isi, Umueze Chima and Ikpoko Akwukwo Ogili joined the festivities on the following order; the last day was marked by a clearance of vegetable containers and packages.

The Umatu festival in Onitsha in 2020 was organized in conformity with the Covid-19 safety requirements and protocols.
